Tira is a town in Hopkins County, Texas, United States. The population was 297 at the 2010 census.

Geography

Tira is located in northern Hopkins County at  (33.326629, –95.569853). Texas State Highway 19 runs through the western part of the town, leading north  to Paris and south  to Sulphur Springs, the Hopkins county seat.

Demographics

As of the 2020 United States census, there were 319 people, 115 households, and 80 families residing in the town.

Education
Tira is served by the North Hopkins Independent School District.

References

Towns in Texas
Towns in Hopkins County, Texas